The 2019 KNVB Cup Final was a football match between Eredivisie clubs Willem II and Ajax that took place on 5 May 2019 at De Kuip, Rotterdam. It was the final match of the 2018–19 KNVB Cup, the 101st season of the annual Dutch national football cup competition.

The winners of this match would compete in the 2019 Johan Cruyff Shield and play in the 2019–20 UEFA Europa League, assuming they haven't qualified for the 2019–20 UEFA Champions League. Since Ajax had qualified for the latter, the spot for the winners were reverted to the league.

Route to the final

Match

Details

References

2019
2018–19 in Dutch football
AFC Ajax matches
Willem II (football club) matches
May 2019 sports events in the Netherlands
Sports competitions in Rotterdam
21st century in Rotterdam